Elamkulam Manakkal Sankaran Namboodiripad (13 June 1909 – 19 March 1998), popularly known as EMS, was an Indian communist politician and theorist, who served as the first Chief Minister of Kerala state in 1957–59 and then again in 1967–69. As a member of the Communist Party of India (CPI), he became the first non-Indian National Congress chief minister in the Indian republic. In 1964, he led a faction of the CPI that broke away to form the Communist Party of India (Marxist) (CPI(M)).

This article contains lists of notable works of and on  E. M. S. Namboodiripad.

Notable works in English

Notable works in Malayalam

Notable works on Namboodiripad

References

External links

 The tireless writer: Sukumar Azhicode

Political bibliographies
Bibliographies by writer
Bibliographies of Indian writers
Political history of Kerala